The English language terminology used in the classification of swords is imprecise and has varied widely over time. There is no historical dictionary for the universal names, classification or terminology of swords; a sword was simply a double edged knife.

Historical terms without a universal consensus of definition (i.e. "arming sword", "broadsword", "long sword", etc.) were used to label weapons of similar appearance but of different historical periods, regional cultures and fabrication technology. These terms were often described in relation to other unrelated weapons, without regard to their intended use and fighting style. In modern history, many of these terms have been given specific, often arbitrary meanings that are unrelated to any of their historical meanings.

Terminology
Some of these terms originate contemporaneously with the weapons which they describe. Others are modern or early modern terms used by antiquarians, curators, and modern-day sword enthusiasts for historical swords.

Terminology was further complicated by terms introduced or misinterpreted in the 19th century by antiquarians and in 20th century pop culture, and by the addition of new terms such as "great sword", "Zweihänder" (instead of Beidhänder), and "cut-and-thrust sword". Historical European Martial Arts associations have turned the term spada da lato into "side-sword". Furthermore, there is a deprecation of the term "broadsword" by these associations. All these newly introduced or redefined terms add to the confusion of the matter.

The most well-known systematic typology of blade types of the European medieval sword is the Oakeshott typology, although this is also a modern classification and not a medieval one. Elizabethans used descriptive terms such as "short", "bastard", and "long" which emphasized the length of the blade, and "two-handed" for any sword that could be wielded by two hands.

Classification by hilt type

Handedness
The term two-handed sword, used as a general term, may refer to any large sword designed to be used primarily with two hands:
 the European longsword, popular in the Late Middle Ages and Renaissance.
 the Scottish late medieval claymore (not to be confused with the basket-hilted claymore of the 18th century)
 the Bidenhänder sword favoured by the Landsknechte of 16th-century Germany.

The term "hand-and-a-half sword" is modern (late 19th century).
During the first half of the 20th century, the term "bastard sword" was used regularly to refer to this type of sword, while "long sword" or "long-sword", if used at all, referred to the rapier (in the context of Renaissance or Early Modern fencing).

The term "single-handed sword" (or "one-handed sword") is a retronym coined to disambiguate from "two-handed" or "hand-and-a-half" specimens.
"Single-handed sword" is used by Sir Walter Scott. It is also used as a possible gloss of the obscure term tonsword by Nares (1822); "one-handed sword" is somewhat later, recorded from c. 1850.

Apparently, many swords were designed for left-hand use, although left-handed swords have been described as "a rarity".

Great sword
Great swords or greatswords are related to the long swords of the Middle Ages. The great sword proper was developed during the Renaissance, but its earlier cousin, the Scottish Claymore, was very similar in size and use, like the "outsized specimens" between 160 cm and 180 cm (approx. the same height as the user) such as the Oakeshott type XIIa or Oakeshott type XIIIa. These swords were too heavy to be wielded one-handed and possessed a large grip for leverage. The point would be to hold the grip with one hand at the top of the grip, and one hand at the bottom. The top hand would push, and the bottom hand would pull; this gave extra leverage thus the sword would be easier to swing, ignoring much of its weight.

Claymore
The Scottish name "claymore" (lit. "large/great sword") can refer to either the longsword with a distinctive two-handed grip, or the basket-hilted sword.  The two handed claymore is an early Scottish version of a greatsword.

Zweihänder 
The Zweihänder ("two-hander") or Beidhänder ("both-hander") is a true two-handed sword, in the sense that it cannot be wielded in only one hand. It was a specialist weapon wielded by certain Landsknechte (mercenary soldiers), so-called Doppelsöldners.

Classification by blade type

Double-edge and straight swords
These are double-edged, usually straight bladed swords, designed for optimized balance, reach and versatility.

() is a double-edged straight sword used during the last 2,500 years in China. The first Chinese sources that mention the  date to the 7th century BC during the Spring and Autumn period; one of the earliest specimens being the Sword of Goujian. There are also larger two-handed versions used by ancient and medieval armies and for training by many styles of Chinese martial arts.

Longsword
These days, the term longsword most frequently refers to a late Medieval and Renaissance weapon designed for use with two hands. The German  ("long sword") in 15th-century manuals did not necessarily denote a type of weapon, but the technique of fencing with both hands at the hilt.

The French  and the English bastard sword originate in the 15th or 16th century, originally having the general sense of "irregular sword or sword of uncertain origin". It was "[a sword] which was neither French, nor Spanish, nor properly  [German], but longer than any of these sturdy swords."  could also historically refer to a single-handed sword with a fairly long blade compared to other short swords.

Joseph Swetnam states that the bastard sword is midway in length between an arming sword and a long sword, and Randall Cotgrave's definition seems to imply this, as well. The term referred to a medieval single-handed sword optimized for thrusting. The term  comes from the fact that these swords passed the length of a "normal" short sword.

The "Masters of Defence" competition organised by Henry VIII in July 1540 listed "two hande sworde", "bastard sworde", and "longe sworde" as separate items (as it should in Joseph Swetnam's context).

Antiquarian usage in the 19th century established the use of "bastard sword" as referring unambiguously to these large swords. However, George Silver and Joseph Swetnam refer to them merely as "two hande sworde". The term "hand-and-a-half sword" is modern (late 19th century). During the first half of the 20th century, the term "bastard sword" was used regularly to refer to this type of sword.

The Elizabethan long sword (cf. George Silver and Joseph Swetnam) is a single-handed "cut-and-thrust" sword with a  blade similar to the long rapier. "Let thy (long) Rapier or (long) Sword be foure foote at the least, and thy dagger two foote." Historical terms (15th to 16th century) for this type of sword included the Italian  and French .

The term longsword has been used to refer to different kinds of sword depending on historical context:
  or two-hander, a late Renaissance sword of the 16th century , the longest sword of all;
 the long "side sword" or "rapier" with a cutting edge (the Elizabethan long sword).

The  was a double-edged longsword used by the Romans. The idea for the  came from the swords of ancient Celts in Germany and Britain.

Broadsword
 Claymore
 Basket-hilted sword
 Sabre

The term "broadsword" was never used historically to describe the one-handed arming sword. The arming sword was wrongly labelled a broadsword by antiquarians as the medieval swords were similar in blade width to the military swords of the day (that were also sometimes labeled as broadswords) and broader than the dueling swords and ceremonial dress swords.

Shortswords and daggers
Knives such as the seax and other blades of similar length – between  – are sometimes construed as swords. This is especially the case for weapons from antiquity, made before the development of high quality steel that is necessary for longer swords, in particular:

Iron Age swords:
Seax, a tool and weapon, common in Northern Europe.
, an early ancient Roman thrusting shortsword for legionaries
, a double-edged, single-hand blade used by the ancient Greeks;
Certain Renaissance-era sidearms:
Baselard, a late medieval heavy dagger;
, a civilian long dagger;
Dirk, the Scottish long dagger;
Hanger or wood-knife, a type of hunting sword or infantry sabre;
Certain fascine knives:

Oversized two-handers used as parade swords or ceremonial weapons often exceeded the length and weight of practical weapons of war.

Edgeless and thrusting swords
The edgeless swords category comprises weapons which are related to or labelled as "swords" but do not emphasise hacking or slashing techniques or have any cutting edges whatsoever. The majority of these elongated weapons were designed for agility, precision and rapid thrusting blows to exploit gaps in the enemy's defences; the major joints of the arms, the opening in a visor. However they mainly saw prominence outside the battlefield as a duelling weapon.

Basket-hilted sword
The basket-hilted sword is a sword type of the early modern era characterised by a basket-shaped guard that protects the hand. The basket hilt is a development of the quillons added to swords' crossguards since the Late Middle Ages.
In modern times, this variety of sword is also sometimes referred to as the broadsword.

Among most Greek warriors, this weapon had an iron blade of about 60 centimetres. The Spartan version was typically only 30–45 centimetres. The Spartan's shorter weapon proved deadly in the crush caused by colliding phalanx formations – it was capable of being thrust through gaps in the enemy's shield wall and armour, where there was no room for longer weapons. The groin and throat were among the favourite targets.

Rapier

The term "rapier" appeared in the English lexicon via the French  which either compared the weapon to a rasp or file; it may be a corruption of "rasping sword" which referred to the sound the blade makes when it comes into contact with another blade. There is no historical Italian equivalent to the English word "rapier".

Panzerstecher and koncerz
The  ("armour stabber") is a German and East European weapon with a long, edgeless blade of square or triangular cross-section for penetrating armour. Early models were either two-handers or "hand-and-a-half" hilted, while later 16th and 17th century models (also known as koncerz) were one-handed and used by cavalry.

Tuck and verdun
The "tuck" (French , Italian ) is an edgeless blade of square or triangular cross-section used for thrusting. In French,  also means thrust or point; and  means cut and thrust.

The tuck may also get its name from the verb "to tuck" which means "to shorten".

Small-sword

The small sword or smallsword (also court sword or dress sword) is a light one-handed sword designed for thrusting which evolved out of the longer and heavier rapier of the late Renaissance. The height of the small sword's popularity was between the mid-17th and late 18th century. It is thought to have appeared in France and spread quickly across the rest of Europe. The small sword was the immediate predecessor of the Épée de Combat from which the Épée developed<ref>Evangelista, Nick. The Encyclopedia of the Sword. Westport, Connecticut: Greenwood Press, 1995. p. 208</ref> and its method of use—as typified in the works of such authors as Sieur de Liancour, Domenico Angelo, Monsieur J. Olivier, and Monsieur L'Abbat—developed into the techniques of the French classical school of fencing. Small swords were also used as status symbols and fashion accessories; for most of the 18th century anyone, civilian or military, with pretensions to gentlemanly status would have worn a small sword on a daily basis.

Single-edge and curved swords
These are single-cutting edged, usually thick or curved construction bladed swords, typically designed for slashing, chopping, severing limbs, tripping or broad sweeping techniques; but were often very poorly designed for stabbing. Swordsmen were trained to use the dulled side for defensive and blocking techniques.

Backsword

The backsword was a single-edged, straight-bladed sword, typically for military use. This type of sword had a thickened back to the blade (opposite the cutting edge), which gave the blade strength. The backsword blade was cheaper to manufacture than a two-edged blade. This type of sword was first developed in Europe in the 15th century and reflected the emergence of asymmetric guards, which made a two-edged blade somewhat redundant. The backsword reached its greatest use in the 17th and 18th century when many cavalry swords, such as the British 1796 Heavy Cavalry Sword, were of this form.

 are single-edged Chinese swords, primarily used for slashing and chopping. It is considered "The General of All Weapons".

Hook sword

Khopesh

The khopesh is an ancient Egyptian curved short sword with a length of approx. 50–60 cm long and typically made of bronze or iron.

Katana

Historically,  were one of the traditionally made  that were used by the samurai of feudal Japan. Modern versions of the katana are sometimes made using non-traditional materials and methods. The katana is characterized by its distinctive appearance: a curved, slender, single-edged blade usually with a round guard and long grip to accommodate two hands.

Hanger
The hanger (obs. whinyard, whinger, cuttoe), wood-knife, or hunting sword is a long knife or short sword that hangs from the belt and was popular as both a hunting tool and weapon of war.

Falchion and cutlass
The falchion (French , Spanish ) proper is a wide straight-bladed but curved edged hanger or long knife. The term 'falchion' may also refer to the early cutlass.

The cutlass or curtal-axe also known as a falchion (French ; Italian ; German ) is a broad-bladed curved hanger or long knife. In later usage, 'cutlass' referred to the short naval boarding sabre.

Sabre

The sabre (US saber) or shable (French , Spanish , Italian , German , Russian , Hungarian , Polish , Ukrainian ) is a single-edged curved bladed cavalry sword.

Scimitar

See also
 
 Types of swords
 History of the sword
 Oakeshott typology

References

External links
 Best and most powerful martial arts, fight science

 Top Quality Bokken/ Katana Sword available for Martial Arts training

Lists of swords
Blade weapons
Swords